The Family First Party is an Australian political party based in South Australia, founded on 28 July 2021 by former state Labor ministers Jack Snelling and Tom Kenyon. As of March 2022, Lyle Shelton is the party's National Director.

History
The Family First Party previously existed as a political party in Australia, founded in 2002 by Andrew Evans, who won a seat in the South Australian Legislative Council at the state election that year. In 2017 it merged with the Australian Conservatives which dissolved in 2019. 

On 28 July 2021, Jack Snelling and Tom Kenyon both left the Labor Party, forming the Family First Party. Upon founding the party, Snelling has said that "we are very concerned about religious freedom and attempts to restrict that freedom", and that "I think that particularly in the last few years the political environment has shifted significantly in both the major parties where you simply cannot prosecute arguments about religious liberty".

Both The Australian and ABC News noted that the Liberal Marshall government in South Australia was led by moderates who had supported reforms relating to abortion and euthanasia. Snelling has cited "moves to restrict the rights of hospitals and clinicians to refuse to participate in abortions and euthanasia" as a concern.

Snelling claimed that "we have the support of some of the founding members of Family First including Andrew Evans". Evans told The Advertiser that "I don't mind them doing it. It puts a brake on the major parties", but added that he would not be involved in the new party as "I've done my bit". The Australian reported that Snelling and Kenyon had acquired Family First's "data base of about 6000 supporters". Former Family First senator and current leader of the Australian Family Party, Bob Day, however, said the new party was "not restarting Family First", noting that Snelling and Kenyon were "longstanding members of the Labor Party with a long tradition in the union movement". Former Senator and leader of the Australian Conservatives, Cory Bernardi, said of Family First that he would "cheer them on", and that he had released intellectual property associated with the former Family First name to the new party.

Snelling told a Sunday Mail journalist in July 2021 that he was the chairman of an incorporated association called "Family First Party" which was not yet registered as a political party. The Advertiser reported that "former Family First insiders" believed that the new party was formed with the intent of taking marginal seats from the Liberal Party in northeastern Adelaide. Snelling has said that "I have had no discussions with anybody in the ", and that he had not discussed the decision to form Family First with either party leader Peter Malinauskas or Labor's state executive.

The Advertiser also wrote on 30 July 2021 that a Liberal member had said that the "fuse had been lit" for a potential breakaway party from the Liberals to be formed after the Family First Party's formation, with "some Liberals" also worrying that the party could potentially cause the Liberals to lose seats in northeastern Adelaide.

On 1 August 2021, it was reported that Deepa Mathew, who ran for the Liberal Party in the seat of Enfield at the 2018 South Australian state election, had joined the Family First Party. Mathew claimed that the Liberal Party was "introducing legislation that is a serious threat to the very fabric of our society and families, especially around individual's and organisations' freedom to be able to conscientious object based on your beliefs". Federal Liberal MP for Boothby, Nicolle Flint, called Mathew's defection a "big loss for the Liberal Party", and that she was "deeply saddened to learn that Deepa was leaving the Liberal Party – I firmly believe if you want to change things do it from within". The Advertiser wrote that Mathew was expected to run as a candidate for Family First.

The party was registered by the Electoral Commission of South Australia on 13 January 2022.

On May 27, 2022, the party announced the appointment of former Australian Christian Lobby boss Lyle Shelton as their National Director.

2022 South Australian election
The party ran candidates in the 2022 South Australian state election. Initially, Family First said it aimed to run in all 47 seats of the South Australian House of Assembly. Snelling did not intend to run, but Kenyon was reported to be considering candidacy. InDaily reported that Kenyon was "expected" to run as Family First's lead candidate in the Legislative Council.

When candidate lists were finalised, Family First had candidates in 34 seats, and three candidates (Tom Kenyon, Deepa Mathew and Craig Bowyer) for the Legislative Council. At the election, the party received 3.7% of the primary vote in the Lower House and 3.05% in the Upper House, and were not successful in getting any candidate elected. Their highest vote was in the seat of Ramsay with 11.4% – a 6.9% swing to the party.

Tom Kenyon, the party's Chairman, reflected on Family First's results after the election: “Our primary goal was to unseat bad members in the lower house, to get a better parliament, and show that we can move the Christian vote around.”

“The life and freedom vote moved about five to ten per cent in a whole bunch of seats, and that counts,” he said. “I don’t think they can discount us now.”

2022 Victorian election
The party has indicated that it plans to contest the upcoming Victorian State Election. Family First Victoria was registered as a political party with the Victorian Electoral Commission as of October 6 2022.

The Party ran in all 88 seats of the Victorian House of Assembly and all seats in the Legislative Council. They failed to win any seats, obtaining 3.05% of the vote in the lower house, and 2.01% of the vote in the upper house.

2023 New South Wales election
The party which is unregistered in NSW is running the 2023 New South Wales state election for the Legislative Council as a group list with Lyle Shelton.

References

External links

Christian political parties in Australia
Conservative parties in Australia
Political parties in South Australia
Political parties established in 2021
2021 establishments in Australia